Mehryn Donegan Kraker (born June 5, 1994) is an American professional basketball player for the Rockingham Flames of the NBL1 West. She played college basketball for Green Bay before being drafted by the Washington Mystics in the third round of the 2017 WNBA draft. She has since played in Spain, Sweden, Australia, and in the Global Women's Basketball Association.

Early life and high school career 
Kraker was born in West Allis, Wisconsin, and attended West Allis Central High School. Kraker was a four time All-Conference selection in the Greater Metro Conference, as well as its player of the year once. She was also a two-time All-Area/All-Suburban team selection by the Milwaukee Journal Sentinel, a two-time All-State selection, and a Wisconsin Basketball Coaches Association All-Star Game pick. Kraker graduated as West Allis Central's all time leader in points, assists, and steals.

College career 
Kraker redshirted her freshman year to ensure a full four years of eligibility. Her first season in 2013–14 saw her start 31 games of the 32-game season, where she became the first Phoenix player since Julie Wojta to score more than 30 points in a game. Kraker was also named Horizon League Freshman of the Week, and received selections to the 2014 Horizon League All-Freshman team, as well as the Horizon League All-Tournament Team. The following year, Kraker was named to the Horizon League's All-League Second Team, and led the team in scoring with 12.5 points per game. She was named again to the All-League Second Team and received Horizon League Tournament MVP honors in the 2015–16 season. Kraker was named Horizon League Player of the Year her senior year, as well as ESPN.com's Mid-Major player of the year. Kraker graduated as Green Bay's record holder for most three-pointers made in a season and career.

Green Bay statistics

Source

Professional career 
Kraker declared for the 2017 WNBA draft, where she was selected 27th overall in the third round by the Washington Mystics. She appeared in two preseason games before being waived prior to the start of the 2017 WNBA season.

For the 2017–18 season, Kraker moved to Spain to play for Cadi La Seu in the Liga Femenina de Baloncesto. She returned to Cadi La Seu for the 2018–19 season.

After a stint with the Wisconsin GLO of the Global Women's Basketball Association (GWBA), Kraker returned to Spain for the 2019–20 season to play for IDK Euskotren.

Kraker initially renewed her contract with IDK Euskotren in June 2020 but departed the team to return to the United States as a coach.

After another stint with the Wisconsin GLO in 2021, Kraker moved to Sweden for the 2021–22 season to play for KFUM Ostersund Basket. Following the Swedish season, she moved to Australia to play for the Rockingham Flames of the NBL1 West in the 2022 season.

Coaching career 
Kraker spent the 2020–21 U.S. college season as an assistant coach with the Green Bay Phoenix.

Awards and honors

High school 
 4x Greater Metro Conference All-Conference 
 Greater Metro Conference Player of the Year
 2x Wisconsin Basketball Coaches Association (WCBA) All-State
 2x Milwaukee Journal Sentinel All-Area/All-Suburban 
 WCBA All-Star

College 
 Horizon League Player of the Year (2017)
 espnW Mid-Major Player of the Year (2017)
 Horizon League Tournament MVP (2016)
 All-Horizon League Second Team (2015, 2016)
 Horizon League All-Freshman Team (2014)
 Horizon League Freshman of the Week (11/11/2014)
 Third all-time program points (1,671)

References 

1994 births
Living people
American expatriate basketball people in Australia
American expatriate basketball people in Spain
American expatriate basketball people in Sweden
American women's basketball players
Basketball players from Wisconsin
Forwards (basketball)
Green Bay Phoenix women's basketball players
People from West Allis, Wisconsin
Washington Mystics draft picks